Arwel Camber Thomas (born 8 November 1974) is a native of Trebanos in Swansea Valley. He is a former Wales international rugby union player. An outside-half, he played his club rugby for Swansea RFC.

Career 
Arwel Thomas won his first of his 23 caps against Italy in 1996 when he replaced the injured Neil Jenkins. He played club rugby for Swansea for seven years, scoring 1963 points including 40 tries. He turned down an offer to join Toulouse in 1999, and in 2005 he returned to Neath. In 2008 he announced his retirement from rugby after the 2008 Konica Minolta Cup final against Pontypridd. Thomas later reversed his decision and was given the captaincy of Neath for the 2009–10 season.

References

External links
Wales profile

1974 births
Living people
People from Glanamman
Neath RFC players
People educated at Cwmtawe Community School
Rugby union players from Carmarthenshire
Swansea RFC players
Wales international rugby union players
Welsh rugby union players